The 28th Pennsylvania House of Representatives District is in southwestern Pennsylvania and has been represented by Rob Mercuri since 2021.

District profile 
The 28th Pennsylvania House of Representatives District is located in Allegheny County and includes the following areas:

 Bradford Woods
Hampton Township (part)
District 01 
District 02 
District 06 
District 07 
District 08 
District 09 
District 10 
District 11
 Marshall Township
 Pine Township
Richland Township
West Deer Township

Representatives

Recent election results

2020 Election 

On January 23, 2020, the incumbent office-holder, Mike Turzai, announced that he would be retiring from office at the end of his current term, to seek opportunities in the private sector.  Candidates to replace him included:

Republican Party:
 Libby Blackburn (website) - School board member from McCandless Township
 Mike Heckmann (website) - part of Turzai's policy staff, from Wexford
 Rob Mercuri (website) - PNC Bank vice president and military veteran, of Pine Township

Democratic Party:
 Emily Skopov (website, party site) - nonprofit entrepreneur, of Marshall Township

Republican primary results 

On June 2, 2020, Pennsylvania held its primary election.  The Republican nomination was the only one contested, and its results were:

References

External links 

 District map from the United States Census Bureau
 Pennsylvania House Legislative District Maps from the Pennsylvania Redistricting Commission.
 Population Data for District 28 from the Pennsylvania Redistricting Commission.

Government of Allegheny County, Pennsylvania
28